Dracula is the title of several horror film series centered on Count Dracula, who is accidentally resurrected, bringing with him a plague of vampirism, and the ensuing efforts of the heroic Van Helsing family to stop him.

Hammer Horror film series (1958–1974)
The original series of films consisted of nine installments, which starred iconic horror actors Christopher Lee and Peter Cushing as Count Dracula and Doctor Van Helsing, respectively. The series of films is part of the larger Hammer Horror series.

Production of Dracula began at Bray Studios on 17 November 1957 with an investment of £81,000. As Count Dracula, Lee fixed the image of the fanged vampire in popular culture. Christopher Frayling writes, "Dracula introduced fangs, red contact lenses, décolletage, ready-prepared wooden stakes and—in the celebrated credits sequence—blood being spattered from off-screen over the Count's coffin." Lee also introduced a dark, brooding sexuality to the character, with Tim Stanley stating, "Lee's sensuality was subversive in that it hinted that women might quite like having their neck chewed on by a stud".

In 2017 a poll of 150 actors, directors, writers, producers and critics for Time Out magazine saw Dracula ranked the 65th-best British film ever. Empire magazine ranked Lee's portrayal as Count Dracula the 7th-greatest horror movie character of all time.

 Dracula (1958)Jonathan Harker (John Van Eyssen) begets the ire of Count Dracula (Christopher Lee) after he accepts a job at the vampire's castle under false pretenses, forcing his colleague Dr. Van Helsing (Peter Cushing) to destroy the predatory villain when he targets Harker's loved ones.
 The Brides of Dracula (1960)Following the death of Count Dracula, the film continues the adventures of Dr. Van Helsing as he faces a different set of vampires, Baron (David Peel) and Baroness Meinster (Martita Hunt) of Transylvania.
 Dracula: Prince of Darkness (1966)The Kents (Barbara Shelley, Francis Matthews, Suzan Farmer and Charles Tingwell), after arriving at a tiny hamlet in the Carpathian Mountains, are diverted to the former castle of Count Dracula, where his former manservant Klove (Philip Latham) seeks to use their blood to allow him to rise from the grave once more.
 Dracula Has Risen from the Grave (1968)While trying to exorcise Castle Dracula, the Monsignor (Rupert Davies) inadvertently accidentally brings Count Dracula back from the dead. Once awakened, Dracula follows the Monsignor back to his hometown, preying on the holy man's beautiful niece Maria (Veronica Carlson) and her friend (Barry Andrews).
 Taste the Blood of Dracula (1970)After three distinguished English gentlemen (Geoffrey Keen, Peter Sallis and John Carson) accidentally resurrect Count Dracula, unknowingly killing a disciple of his (Ralph Bates) in the process, the Count seeks to avenge his dead servant by making the trio die at the hands of their own children.
 Scars of Dracula (1970)After a huge vampire bat drops blood on his ashes, Dracula rises again to trouble Simon (Dennis Waterman) and Sarah (Jenny Hanley), a couple on a lookout for Paul (Christopher Matthews), who had mysteriously disappeared a while back.
 Dracula A.D. 1972 (1972)After Van Helsing (Peter Cushing) despatches Dracula to his grave in 1872, the Dark Lord is raised by Johnny Alucard (Christopher Neame) 100 years later in 1972, modern London. When the swinging trendies of London decide to experiment with a little devil-worshipping, the Count decides to move to his own bloody groove, preying on a group of young partygoers that includes the descendant of his nemesis, Van Helsing (Stephanie Beacham), and her grandfather (Peter Cushing).
 The Satanic Rites of Dracula (1973)After an expert vampire researcher (Michael Coles) is hired by the British Secret Service (Richard Vernon) to investigate the mysterious death of an agent (Maurice O'Connell) who died while working to expose a Satanic cult led by Chin Yang (Barbara Yu Ling), who seek to use Mia Martin to summon back Dracula to help develop a new strain of bubonic plague, with the evil intention of annihilating all life on Earth, they turn to Lorrimer Van Helsing and his granddaughter (Joanna Lumley) for assistance.
 The Legend of the 7 Golden Vampires (1974)Professor Van Helsing and his son (Robin Stewart) are hired later in 1904 after giving a lecture at a Chinese university to take on a group of seven sword-wielding vampires wearing gold masks, resurrected by Count Dracula (John Forbes-Robertson and David de Keyser).

Feature films

Cast and characters

Crew

Influence
Upon publishing extracts of their screenplay for Anno Dracula in an updated version of the first book in the series, author Kim Newman revealed the film would use the likeness of Peter Cushing to represent the severed head of the deceased Van Helsing, establishing elements of the Hammer Productions Dracula film series as the backdrop for the film adaptation's events, specifically an imagined alternate ending to the 1958 Dracula film. The fourth book in the series, subtitled Johnny Alucard, follows the character of the same name originally introduced in Dracula A.D. 1972.

References

 
Film series introduced in 1958
Hammer Film Productions horror films
Hammer Film Productions
Resurrection in film